Alt Empordà ("Upper Empordà") is a comarca (county) in Girona, Catalonia, Spain, one of two into which Empordà was divided by the comarcal division of Catalonia in 1936, the other one being Baix Empordà.

Municipalities

References

External links 

 IDESCAT: statistical information about Alt Empordà 
 Official comarcal web site 
 Alt Empordà guide  
 Setmanari de l'Alt Empordà 
 Tramuntana TV. Figueres & Alt Empordà online TV. Video news 

 
Comarques of the Province of Girona